Bilga is a large village near the city of Nurmahal. Nurmahal is a sub tehsil in the district Jalandhar in the Indian state of Punjab.

About 
The majority of people living in Bilga are of Sikh religion.
The nearest main road to Bilga is Phillaur-Nurmahal road which is almost 2 km from the village. The nearest Railway station to this village is the Bilga railway station.

In the centre of the town there is a large gurudwara, of historical significance, the Shri Guru Arjan Dev Sikh Temple, as the 5th Guru of the Sikhs, Shri Guru Arjan Dev Ji (first Sikh Guru to be martyred) had visited the area during the time of his wedding in the neighbouring village of Meo in the year 1589. People from all over the world visit this gurdwara. Shri Guru Arjan Dev ji's Vastras(clothes) are still present there and are on display.

Demographics
At the 2011 census, the population of the village was 10,125 of which 5,182 were male and 4,943 female, a sex ratio of 954.  There were 949 children aged 6 or under, which was 9.37%.  The literacy rate was 81.69% - 85.73% for males and 77.49% for females.

This village has one sarpanch who has been elected by villagers under the legislative committee of Jalandhar. 

The village is also close to the Bilga general hospital which is located on the outskirts of the village.

The village is divided in 7 portions (portion of a village is known as a patti) which have their own names, these are :
 Patti Bhalaayi 
 Patti Duniya Mansoor
 Patti Bhoja
 Patti Mahena
 Patti Bagga
 Patti Bhatti 
 Patti Neelowaal

References

Villages in Jalandhar district